Gordon Arnaud Winter,  (October 6, 1912 – August 1, 2003) was the sixth lieutenant governor of Newfoundland from 1974 to 1981.

In 1974, he was made an Officer of the Order of Canada.

In 1989, he headed the Winter Commission, the diocesan commission appointed by bishop Alphonsus Liguori Penney to undertake an inquiry about the clerical child sexual abuse scandal at Mount Cashel orphanage.

References

1912 births
2003 deaths
Lieutenant Governors of Newfoundland and Labrador
Officers of the Order of Canada